Paul Zielinski (20 November 1911 – 20 February 1966) was a German football player who participated in the 1934 FIFA World Cup.

Club career 
Zielinski played club football with SV Union Hamborn, LSV Markersdorf and Rapid Kassel.

International career 
Zielinski won 15 caps for the German national team in the mid-1930s.

References

External links
 

1911 births
1966 deaths
German footballers
Germany international footballers
1934 FIFA World Cup players
1. FC Bocholt managers
Association football midfielders
German football managers